Pikknurme is a village in Põltsamaa Parish, Jõgeva County in Estonia. It is located just northwest of Puurmani, by the Tallinn  –Tartu road (E263). Pikknurme has a population of 203 (as of 10 April 2006). The village is crossed by the Pikknurme River.

References

Villages in Jõgeva County
Kreis Dorpat